is a tram stop on the Hiroden Main Line located in Nishi-kan'on-machi, Nishi-ku, Hiroshima, Japan.

Routes
From Nishi-kanon-machi Station, there are two of Hiroden Streetcar routes.

 Hiroshima Station - Hiroden-miyajima-guchi Route
 Hiroden-nishi-hiroshima - Hiroshima Port Route

Connections
█ Main Line
 
Kanon-machi — Nishi-kanon-machi — Fukushima-cho

Around station
Peace Boulevard

History
Opened as "Fukushima-Byōin-mae" on February 10, 1960.
Renamed as "Miyako-chō" on February 12, 1962.
Renamed as "Nishi-kanon-machi" on September 1, 1964.

See also
Hiroden Streetcar Lines and Routes

References 

Nishi-kanon-machi Station
Railway stations in Japan opened in 1960